Paul A. Cantor (October 25, 1945 – February 25, 2022) was an American literary and media critic. He taught for many years at the University of Virginia, where he was the Clifton Waller Barrett Professor of English.  

Cantor wrote on a wide range of subjects, including Homer, Plato, Aristotle, Dante, Cervantes, Shakespeare, Christopher Marlowe, Ben Jonson, Jean-Jacques Rousseau, William Blake, Lord Byron, Percy Bysshe Shelley, Mary Shelley, Jane Austen, Romanticism, Oscar Wilde, H. G. Wells, Friedrich Nietzsche, Mark Twain, Elizabeth Gaskell, Thomas Mann, Samuel Beckett, Salman Rushdie, Leo Strauss, Tom Stoppard, Don Delillo, New Historicism, Austrian economics, postcolonial literature, contemporary popular culture, and relations between culture and commerce.

Early life 
Cantor was born in New York City on October 25, 1945. As a young man he was an avid reader with interests in science, philosophy, and literature. He has given an account of his early years in his intellectual autobiography.

While still in high school, Cantor attended Ludwig von Mises' economics seminars in New York City.

He went on to study English literature at Harvard (A.B., 1966, Ph.D., 1971), where he studied literature with Larry Benson, Hershel Baker, and Walter Jackson Bate and politics with Harvey Mansfield.

Critical focal points

Shakespeare criticism
Cantor published extensively on Shakespeare. In Shakespeare's Rome: Republic and Empire (1974), a revision of his doctoral thesis, he analyzed Shakespeare's Roman plays and contrasted the austere, republican mentality of Coriolanus with the bibulous and erotic energies of Antony and Cleopatra. He returned to the Roman plays in Shakespeare's Roman Trilogy: The Twilight of the Ancient World (2017).

In Shakespeare: Hamlet (1989), he depicted Hamlet as a man torn between pagan and Christian conceptions of heroism. In his articles on Macbeth, he analyzed "the Scottish play" using the same polarity.

Cantor also published articles on several other Shakespeare plays, including As You Like It, The Merchant of Venice, Henry V, Othello, King Lear, Timon of Athens, and The Tempest.

A characteristic feature of Cantor's scholarship is his focus on various political regimes and their depiction in Shakespeare's plays. Cantor notes that different regimes promote different ideas about human beings, the good, and government. He compares and contrasts the early Roman regime as depicted in Coriolanus and the later Roman regime as depicted in Antony and Cleopatra, pagan values and Christian values, republican regimes and monarchical regimes. 

Several sets of Cantor's lectures on Shakespeare are available on the internet (see below).

Romanticism 
Cantor's second book, Creature and Creator: Myth-Making and English Romanticism (1984), included discussions of Rousseau, Blake, Byron, and the Shelleys.

Popular culture and media criticism 
Cantor was perhaps best known in his later years for his writings on popular culture. He published three books in this field. In Gilligan Unbound: Pop Culture in the Age of Globalization (2003), he used literary and critical methods to analyze four popular American television shows: Gilligan's Island, Star Trek, The Simpsons, and The X-Files. Nine years later he followed this book up with another book on movies and television, The Invisible Hand in Popular Culture: Liberty vs. Authority in American Film and TV (2012). His third and final book on popular culture was Pop Culture and the Dark Side of the American Dream: Con Men, Gangsters, Drug Lords, and Zombies (2019).

Cantor also published many articles on films and television shows, most of which are listed on his webpage at the University of Virginia and on his CV. A 2004 article in Americana described Cantor as "a preeminent scholar in the field of American popular culture studies."

Austrian economics 
Cantor combined his interests in literature and culture with an interest in Austrian Economics. Literature and the Economics of Liberty: Spontaneous Order in Culture (2010), a collection of essays Cantor edited with Stephen Cox, explored ways of using Austrian economics to understand works of literature. Cantor presented his work at the Ludwig von Mises Institute, and in 1992 he received the Ludwig von Mises Prize for Scholarship in Austrian Economics.

Books 
 Shakespeare's Rome: Republic and Empire.  Cornell University Press, 1976.  Reprinted with a new preface, University of Chicago Press (paperback), 2017.
 Creature and Creator: Myth-making and English Romanticism.  Cambridge University Press, 1984.   
 Shakespeare: Hamlet.  Cambridge University Press, 1989. Second edition (revised), 2004
 Macbeth und die Evangelisierung von Schottland.  Siemens Foundation, 1993. Translated into Korean and published by Editus Publishing Company, 2018.
 Gilligan Unbound: Pop Culture in the Age of Globalization. Rowman & Littlefield, 2001.  
 Literature and the Economics of Liberty: Spontaneous Order in Culture.  Ludwig von Mises Institute, 2009.  Co-edited with Stephen Cox.
 The Invisible Hand in Popular Culture: Liberty vs. Authority in American Film and TV.  University Press of Kentucky, 2012. 
 Shakespeare’s Roman Trilogy: The Twilight of the Ancient World. University of Chicago Press, 2017.
 Pop Culture and the Dark Side of the American Dream: Con Men, Gangsters, Drug Lords, and Zombies. University Press of Kentucky, 2019.

Death
Cantor had a stroke in mid-February 2022. He died on February 25, 2022, in Charlottesville, Virginia, at the age of 76.

References

External links

 Webpages
 Paul Cantor's faculty profile on the University of Virginia English Department website, with some bibliography.
 Paul Cantor website, created and curated by a former student; contains writings, lecture notes, links.
 A Brief Intellectual Autobiography of Paul Cantor
 Complete CV of Paul Cantor
 Cantor's articles at reason.com
 Cantor's texts at mises.org

 Video lectures by Cantor
 A series of ten audio/video lectures by Cantor on Commerce and Culture at the Mises Institute in Auburn, Alabama (2006).
 A series of twenty-five video lectures by Cantor on the theme of Shakespeare and Politics, recorded in the government department of Harvard University (2013). Course consists of an introductory lecture followed by three lectures on each of the following plays Coriolanus, Julius Caesar, Antony and Cleopatra, Henry V, Merchant of Venice, Hamlet, Othello, and Macbeth.
 A series of thirty video lectures on Shakespeare and The Politics of Genre. Course consists of a brief introductory lecture, followed by lectures on Richard II; Henry IV, Part 1; Henry IV, Part II; Henry V; Romeo and Juliet, A Midsummer Night's Dream, As You Like It, Twelfth Night, and King Lear.
 A series of 10 video talks on Shakespeare's Rome. Course includes lectures on Coriolanus, Julius Caesar, and Antony and Cleopatra.

 Individual lectures and talks by Cantor
 Economics and Literature: A Tribute and Celebration (2010 Austrian Scholars Conference)
 The Invisible Hand in Popular Culture (C-Span, August 2013)
 What Literature Can Teach Economics (Property and Freedom Society, September 2013)
 The Apocalyptic Strain in Popular Culture (Program on Constitutional Government at Harvard, June 9, 2015)
 Shakespeare, Rome, and The American Republic (a lecture at the Menard Family George Washington Forum, October 2017)
 William Shakespeare and the Roots of Western Civilization (a lecture delivered at Texas Tech University, May 29, 2018)
 The Poet, the Philosopher, and the Politician in Shakespeare's The Tempest (a lecture at Roosevelt University April 4, 2019)
 Much Ado About Money: Shakespeare as Entrepreneur (a lecture delivered at Baylor University October 20, 2020)
 Paul Cantor on Henry V (a lecture hosted by Yeshiva University's Straus Center for Torah and Western Thought, Fall 2020)
 Paul Cantor on Zombies, Pop Culture, and the CDC (Arizona State University, May 2020)
 Shakespeare's Anatomy of Love: Much Ado About Nothing (Zoom webinar at South Texas College, April 6, 2021)

Cantor interviews on conversations with Bill Kristol
 Conversations with Bill Kristol (September 2014): Cantor on Shakespeare and politics (Part 1)
 Conversations with Bill Kristol (October 2015): Cantor on popular culture.
 Conversations with Bill Kristol (August 2016): Cantor on literature and liberty
 Conversations with Bill Kristol (September 2017): Cantor on Shakespeare's Rome
 Conversations with Bill Kristol (June 2018): Cantor on Shakespeare and politics (Part II)
 Conversations with Bill Kristol (October 2018): Cantor on great television and the emergence of a TV canon
 Conversations with Bill Kristol (April 2019): Cantor on The Godfather, Breaking Bad, Huckleberry Finn, and the American Dream
 Conversations with Bill Kristol (November 2019): Cantor on the Shakespeare authorship question
 Conversations with Bill Kristol (March 2020): Cantor on Hollywood westerns
 Conversations with Bill Kristol (August 2020): Cantor on the crisis in higher education and online learning
 Conversations with Bill Kristol (June 2021): Cantor on Shakespeare and comedy.

 Other interviews (video and print)
 Institute Encounters, Steve Balch interviews Cantor at Texas Tech University (June 2018)
 Austrian economic and culture: An interview with Paul Cantor (2001)
 Conversation with Paul A. Cantor on popular American culture (2005)
 The Economics of Literature (Interview on Reason TV, October 8, 2010)

 Online publications
 Cantor's article "This Is Not Your Father's FBI" (On the X-Files) (2001)
 Cantor's article "Popular Culture and Spontaneous Order or How I Learned To Stop Worrying and Love the Tube" (2006)
 Cantor's review article "Economic and Cultural Globalization" (2007)
 Cantor's book, co-edited with Stephen Cox: Literature and the Economics of Liberty: Spontaneous Order in Culture (2009).
 An hour-long audio-presentation of the above book (2010) by Paul A. Cantor
 Cantor's essay on "The Apocalyptic Strain in Popular Culture" (2013)

1945 births
2022 deaths
American literary critics
Harvard Graduate School of Arts and Sciences alumni
Mises Institute people
University of Virginia faculty
Writers from New York City